The line-spotted forest skink (Sphenomorphus lineopunctulatus) is a species of skink. It is found in Thailand, Cambodia, and Laos.

References

lineopunctulatus
Reptiles described in 1962
Taxa named by Edward Harrison Taylor
Reptiles of Cambodia
Reptiles of Laos
Reptiles of Thailand